Dorotheus of Sidon (c. 75 CE - ?? CE) was a 1st-century Greek astrologer and astrological poet, who, during the Hellenistic Period, wrote a didactic poem on horoscopic astrology in Greek, known as the Pentateuch (Πεντάτευχος; lit. five books; more commonly known in the Western world as Carmen Astrologicum). The Pentateuch, which was a textbook on Hellenistic astrology, has come down to us mainly from an Arabic translation dating from around 800 AD carried out by Omar Tiberiades (itself a translation of a Middle Persian translation from the original Greek). The text, fragmentary at times, is therefore not entirely reliable and is further corrupted by interpolations by the later Persian translators. Nevertheless, it remains one of our best sources for the practice of Hellenistic astrology, and it was a work of great influence on later Christian, Persian, Arab and medieval astrologers. The late 1st century, a time when Dorotheus is believed to have flourished, was a period of intense astrological development, following two millennia of accumulated tradition.

Very little is known about Dorotheus himself.  Dorotheus most likely lived and worked in Alexandria, in Egypt, which, in addition to being the most important scholastic center in the Hellenistic world, was also the main location where the oldest Mesopotamian, Greek and Egyptian astrological techniques were synthesized together in order to create horoscopic astrology.  According to Firmicus Maternus, Dorotheus was originally a native of the city of Sidon (Firmicus, Mathesis, 2, 29: 2).

References

External links
Ἀποτελεσματικά (Apotelesmatica), original text online & biography
Project Hindsight - on Dorotheus and contemporaries
Deborah Houlding on Dorotheus' use of aspects
Article on Dorotheus of Sidon's life, works, and legacy

Publications
Dorothei Sidonii Carmen Astrologicum, ed. David Pingree, Teubner, Leipzig, 1976.
Dorotheus of Sidon, Carmen Astrologicum, tr. David Pingree, English translation of the Arabic re-published by Ascella Publications (London, 1993). Re-published again by Astrology Classics (Bel Air, MD), 2005.
Robert Hand, Introduction to The Record of the Early Sages in Greek.  Project Hindsight. (Golden Hind Press, Berkeley Springs, WV, 1996.) (Online at: .)

Ancient Greek astrologers
People from Sidon